The fourth edition of the annual Four Hills Tournament in Germany and Austria was the first of its kind to have ski jumpers from the Warsaw Pact zone competing.

The Finnish delegation around defending champion Hemmo Silvennoinen did not compete in the second half of the tournament, even though they had a double-lead at that time. Similarly, the two leaders after the third event (Harry Glaß and Max Bolkart) did not record a competitive score at the final event in Bischofshofen. With many athletes not participating through the entire tournament, the victory fell to Nikolay Kamenskiy even though he did not reach the podium at any of the single events.

Participating nations and athletes

The following athletes are listed on the FIS official record, but it is likely to be incomplete.

Results

Oberstdorf
 Schattenbergschanze, Oberstdorf
31 December 1955

Garmisch-Partenkirchen
 Große Olympiaschanze, Garmisch-Partenkirchen
01 January 1956

Innsbruck
 Bergiselschanze, Innsbruck
06 January 1956

Bischofshofen
 Paul-Ausserleitner-Schanze, Bischofshofen
08 January 1956

Final ranking

References

External links
 FIS website
 Four Hills Tournament web site

Four Hills Tournament
1955 in ski jumping
1956 in ski jumping